Ivan Vyacheslavovich Zaytsev (born 2 October 1988), nicknamed  ("the Tsar"), is an Italian volleyball player of Russian origin, the captain of Italy men's national volleyball team, a bronze medalist of the Olympic Games London 2012, silver medalist of the European Championship (2011, 2013), bronze medalist of the World League (2013, 2014), Italian Champion (2014) and silver medalist of the Olympic Games Rio 2016.

Career

Clubs
He started his career as a setter in 2004, but later moved to the outside hitter role. He played in Serie A1 at 16 year. His first club was RPA-LuigiBacchi.it Perugia, where he played for two seasons. After this, he moved to M. Roma Volley. In the season 2007/2008, he played for Andreoli Latina. Then he came back to M. Roma Volley and played there until 2012. In 2012, Zaytsev signed with Lube Banca Macerata. With this team, he won the Italian SuperCup in 2012 and the Italian Championship 2013/2014. On May 9, 2014, his departure from Lube was announced. Then for two seasons, he was a player of Russian club VC Dynamo Moscow. he moved to of Al-Arabi SC in Qatar and won the Cup of Emir.
Zaytsev came back to Serie A1 and joined Sir Safety Conad Perugia, the overall dominating Team of the 2017/2018 season in Italy.  Despite failing to reach Champions League final, after losing to Zenit Kazan again, the team managed to take the bronze medal. Zaytsev moves the following season to Modena Volley as Perugia announced that Wilfredo Leon would join the team, taking his spot. Zaytsev has also expressed the desire to play in his favorite role as opposite spiker again.

National team
He debuted with the Italy men's national volleyball team 2008. In the European Championship 2013 Zaytsev was named as the "Best Server". Zaytsev was the main scorer and team leader during World League 2014 and Italy achieved bronze medal. In the World League, he and his teammates won two consecutive bronze in the 2013 and 2014 editions, the latter played in Italy in Florence. He was appointed to the 2014 World Championship held in Poland. He was the leader of his team in the first round, but in the match against the United States injured his ankle, so despite the promotion of his team to second round, he did not play. In 2015 Zaytsev and Italian team achieved silver medal of the 2015 European Championship and Zaytsev was named Best Opposite Spiker. In 2016 he achieved a silver medal at the 2016 Olympics.

Personal life
Zaytsev is the son of Olympic Champion volleyball player Vyacheslav Zaytsev. He was born in Spoleto, where his father was playing at the time. His mother, Irina Pozdnyakova, is a former competitive swimmer.

On 12 May 2008, after ten years of uninterrupted residence in Italy, Ivan Zaytsev obtained Italian citizenship. His sister Anna (born 1975) also holds Italian citizenship, after she married an Italian in 1993.

On May 18, 2013, Zaytsev married Ashling Sirocchi. In April 2014, the couple announced that they were expecting their first child. On October 31, 2014, his wife Ashling gave birth to their son named Alexander "Sasha". In July 2017 the couple announced they are expecting their second child. On January 4, 2018, Ashling gave birth to their daughter named Sienna. They later on had a third child, a girl, Nausicaa.

In November 2016, Zaytsev and Ashling Sirocchi were the testimonials for the Italian alimentary harvest promoted by the Banco Alimentare Foundation.

Outside of volleyball
Zaytsev has appeared in advertisements for companies including Red Bull, DHL Express, Prozis and Toyota. He is also an ambassador for World Food Programme in Italy. He had also voiced the eponymous protagonist in the Italian dub of the 2018 film Bumblebee.

Sporting achievements

Clubs

CEV Champions League
  2016/2017 - with Sir Sicoma Colussi Perugia

CEV Cup
  2014/2015, with Dinamo Moscow

FIVB Club World Championship
  Brazil 2021 – with Cucine Lube Civitanova

National championships
 2011/2012  Italian SuperCup, with Lube Banca Macerata
 2013/2014  Italian Championship, with Lube Banca Macerata
 2015/2016  Emir of Qatar Cup, with Al Arabi
 2016/2017  Italian SuperCup, with Sir Safety Perugia
 2017/2018  Italian Cup, with Sir Safety Perugia
 2017/2018  Italian Championship, with Sir Safety Perugia

National team
 2011  CEV European Championship
 2012  Olympic Games
 2013  FIVB World League
 2013  CEV European Championship
 2014  FIVB World League
 2015  FIVB World Cup
 2015  CEV European Championship
 2016  Olympic Games

Individually
 2010 Serie A2 – Most Valuable Player
 2012 Italian Championship – Most Valuable Player
 2013 FIVB World League – Best Outside Spiker
 2013 CEV European Championship – Best Server
 2013 Best Italian Volleyball Player by Super Volley
 2015 FIVB World Cup – Best Opposite Spiker
 2015 CEV European Championship – Best Opposite Spiker
 2016 Emir of Qatar Cup – Most Valuable Player
 2017 CEV Champions League – Best Outside Spiker

References

External links
 

1988 births
Living people
People from Spoleto
Sportspeople from the Province of Perugia
Italian men's volleyball players
Italian people of Russian descent
Olympic volleyball players of Italy
Volleyball players at the 2012 Summer Olympics
Medalists at the 2012 Summer Olympics
Olympic medalists in volleyball
Olympic bronze medalists for Italy
Italian Champions of men's volleyball
Volleyball players at the 2016 Summer Olympics
Olympic silver medalists for Italy
Italian expatriate sportspeople in Russia
Expatriate volleyball players in Russia
Medalists at the 2016 Summer Olympics
Mediterranean Games medalists in volleyball
Mediterranean Games gold medalists for Italy
Competitors at the 2009 Mediterranean Games
Volleyball players at the 2020 Summer Olympics
Opposite hitters